Namtok Sam Lan National Park is a national park in Saraburi Province, Thailand. Other names for the park include Khao Sam Lan National Park and Phra Puttachai National Park. Home to waterfalls, reservoirs and forests, the park is located near the cave temple Wat Phra Puttachai.

Geography
The park's area is 27,856 rai ~  encompassing parts of four districts: Kaeng Khoi District, Nong Khae District, Wihan Daeng District and Mueang District.

History
During World War II, the Japanese Army occupied and used this area as an encampment, entailing the destruction of some of the park's forests. In 1960 the Thai government began the restoration of this forest and designated it a conservation area. On 2 June 1981, Namtok Sam Lan was designated a National Park.

Attractions
The park's best-known attractions are its waterfalls. Other waterfalls include Pho Hin Dat, Roi Kueak Ma and Ton Rak Sai.

Flora and fauna
Namtok Sam Lan's forest consists of deciduous, mixed dipterocarp and evergreen forest. Tree species include teak (Tectona grandis), Pterocarpus macrocarpus, Afzelia xylocarpa, Hopea odorata, Dipterocarpus tuberculatus, Shorea obtusa, Xylia xylocarpa, Shorea siamensis and Lagerstroemia calyculata.

Animal species include pig-tailed macaque, northern red muntjac, lesser Oriental chevrotain, wild boar, Finlayson's squirrel and northern treeshrew. Birds include brown shrike, greater coucal, green-billed malkoha, Javan pond-heron, long-tailed shrike, Oriental magpie-robin, plain prinia, plaintive cuckoo, puff-throated babbler, red junglefowl, sooty-headed bulbul, streak-eared bulbul, western koel and white-rumped shama. Avian life is believed to have once included the white-eyed river martin, a native of northern Thailand now considered extinct. The park is also noted for its various butterfly species.

See also
List of national parks of Thailand
List of Protected Areas Regional Offices of Thailand

References

National parks of Thailand
Geography of Saraburi province
Tourist attractions in Saraburi province
1981 establishments in Thailand
Protected areas established in 1981